New Mill is a grade II listed post mill at Tadworth, Surrey, England which is on the Buildings at Risk Register.

History

It is not known when New Mill was built, but is thought to have been in the mid eighteenth century. A windmill was recorded at Walton-on-the-Hill in 1295, the earliest in Surrey. A windmill at Tadworth was sold in 1600 and a windmill on Banstead Common was mentioned in a survey of the Manor of Banstead for Sir Nicholas Carew in 1680. An Act of Parliament in 1755 mentions the windmill, which was marked on Rocque's map of 1762. The mill lost two sails in 1893, and worked by wind until 1902, latterly assisted by a steam engine. Another post mill stood close by until 1890.

The second pair of sails fell off in a drought in 1921. The mill was damaged by a bomb in 1941 and again by a flying bomb in 1944. Repairs were carried out in 1950. Recently, concerns have been raised about the condition of the mill, and basic repairs are planned. In January 2009, Reigate and Banstead Council agreed to spend £37,000 on urgent repairs to the mill, which had been placed on the Buildings at Risk Register. An urgent works notice was served on the owner, giving the council the authority to carry out the work itself and claim back the cost from the owner of the mill.

Description

New Mill is a post mill on a two-storey roundhouse, the only such roundhouse in Surrey. It had four Spring Patent sails fixed to a cast iron windshaft.

Its  diameter Brake Wheel of cast iron has 120 teeth. It drove two pairs of millstones in the breast via spur gearing; its Spur Wheel has a  diameter. Winding is by tailpole.

Millers

John May 1780 - 1789
George May 1789 -
John Smith 1795 - 1831, 1834
Mrs E Smith 1845
J H Smith 1874 - 1878
E W Smith 1887 - 1903

References for above:-

External links
Windmill World webpage on Tadworth mill.

References

Industrial buildings completed in 1762
Post mills in the United Kingdom
Grinding mills in the United Kingdom
Grade II listed buildings in Surrey
Windmills in Surrey